The 1940–41 SK Rapid Wien season was the 43rd season in club history.

Squad

Squad and statistics

Squad statistics

Fixtures and results

Gauliga

German championship

Tschammerpokal

References

1940–41 Rapid Wien Season
Rapid
1940–41